An epanorthosis is a figure of speech that signifies emphatic word replacement. "Thousands, no, millions!" is a stock example. Epanorthosis as immediate and emphatic self-correction often follows a Freudian slip (either accidental or deliberate).

Etymology
The word , attested 1570, is from Ancient Greek  "correcting, revision" <  +  "restore, rebuild" <  "up" +  "straighten" <  "straight, right" (hence to "straighten up").

Examples

"Seems, madam! Nay, it is; I know not 'seems.'" (Hamlet, Act 1, Scene 2)
"The psychologist known as Sigmund Fraud—Freud, I mean!"
"I've been doing this for six weeks!—er, days, that is."
"Man has parted company with his trusty friend the horse and has sailed into the azure with the eagles, eagles being represented by the infernal combustion engine–er er, internal combustion engine. [loud laughter] Internal combustion engine! Engine!" – Winston Churchill

The words in italics are technically the epanorthoses, but all the words following the dash may be considered part of the epanorthosis as well. Striking through words is another way of demonstrating such an  effect.

In Aviation English phraseology, the word "correction" must be explicitly used: "climb to reach Flight Level 290 at time 58 — correction at time 55".

A classic leet-like online variant, using caret notation to denote control characters, is the use of ^H (as in "We've always used COBOL^H^H^H^H") to suggest a backspace, or ^W to suggest deletion of the preceding word. Both may be repeated as necessary.
A more modern variant, where markup is available on the communication client, allows the use of plain strikethrough text to use for humorous effect, such as "We are feeling terrible fine."

References 

Figures of speech